Stewart McPherson VC (1819 – 7 December 1892)  was a Scottish soldier in India and a recipient of the Victoria Cross, the highest and most prestigious award for gallantry in the face of the enemy that can be awarded to British and Commonwealth military forces.

Life

Stewart McPherson was born in Culross in 1819, the son of Mungo McPherson and Mary Smith. He left Geddes Public School in the village at 15 and became an apprentice weaver in nearby Dunfermline, but he was soon lured by adventure and foreign travel.  In December 1839 he walked to Stirling to join the British Army's 78th Highlanders, which were later known as the Seaforth Highlanders Ross-shire Buffs, Duke of Albany's.

He married a Culross girl, Elizabeth Haig, in 1848 and the couple went on to have six children - Stewart, Sarah, Eliza, Robina, Ferguson and McGregor.

McPherson saw action in Persia, India and Ireland before arriving in Bengal, India.  He was approximately 38 years old, and now a colour-sergeant.  During his time here, his actions during the Siege of Lucknow in the Indian Mutiny earned him the Victoria Cross. His citation reads:

McPherson was presented with his award by Queen Victoria in December 1880, at Windsor Castle.  Only three weeks after receiving his award, he discharged himself from the army and returned to Scotland, where he was appointed superintendent of the Glasgow Industrial Schools based in Bailieston.

A decade later, the family moved again to Culross where they bought a house in Low Valleyfield.  As a reminder of his time in India it was named Lucknow Villa and it was there that he died, aged 70, in 1892.

Burial

McPherson was laid to rest in his town near Dunfermline.  He was buried in the Fife County Cemetery, in the shadow of Culross Abbey, but his grave became overgrown. About 143 years after being awarded the Victoria Cross a local woman, Janis Ellis, showed businessman Alan Johnson the war hero's last resting place and he decided his valour should be recognized in his home village.  The Fife Council awarded an £1800 grant from the common good fund to pay for a new Indian granite stone - quarried less than 60 miles from Lucknow.  The grave lies to the north-west of the church entrance.

A plaque was also unveiled inside Culross Parish Church at a ceremony which was attended by two of his descendants, Mrs. Lylian Edge and Mr Stuart Lamberton, as well as senior Army personnel.

His Victoria Cross is displayed at the Regimental Museum of Queens Own Highlanders, Fort George, Inverness-shire, Scotland.

References

Monuments to Courage (David Harvey, 1999)
The Register of the Victoria Cross (This England, 1997)
Scotland's Forgotten Valour (Graham Ross, 1995)
 Scotsman Wed 27 September 2000

External links
Location of grave and VC medal (Fife)

1822 births
1892 deaths
People from Culross
British recipients of the Victoria Cross
Seaforth Highlanders soldiers
Indian Rebellion of 1857 recipients of the Victoria Cross
British military personnel of the Anglo-Persian War
British Army recipients of the Victoria Cross

zh:斯图尔特·麦克弗森